Caulerpa is a genus of seaweeds in the family Caulerpaceae (among the green algae). They are unusual because they consist of only one cell with many nuclei, making them among the biggest single cells in the world. This species can be invasive from time to time.

Taxonomy and nomenclature 
First described by Jean Vincent Lamouroux in 1809, Caulerpa is the only genus under the family Caulerpaceae, from the order Bryopsidales, class Ulvophyceae, and phylum Chlorophyta. Through the use of tufA gene sequencing, it was revealed that Pseudochlorodesmis F. Børgesen was a sister clade of Caulerpa. Cremen et al. proposed a new classification scheme in Bryopsidales, wherein Caulerpaceae and Halimedaceae were described as sister families.

Species discrimination via morphology-based identification is often hampered by the high degree of variation among traits. Thus, several species are often misidentified without the use if molecular analyses. As of 2019, there are 101 accepted species, with 40 varieties and 67 forms.

Biology 
Caulerpa species support their large cell size by having the cytoplasm circulate constantly, supported by a network of microtubules. This behavior was known in 1967.

The cytoplasm does not leak out when the cell is cut. Regeneration is directional, with rhizoids at the bottom and fronds at the top.

The genus produces a number of secondary metabolites thought to be related to its toxicity and peppery taste. These include the red pigment alkaloid caulerpin and its derivative caulerchlorin and the amine mixture caulerpicin.

Morphology

External characteristics 

The genus Caulerpa exhibits several different growth forms. They possess a stolon with rhizoids which grow downward, anchoring the plant to the substrate. The stolons support upright fronds or leaves known as assimilators. The structure of the assimilator may be ligulate (leaf-like, e.g. Caulerpa prolifera), or they may have a central axis known as a rachis. The rachis may have lateral branchlets known as ramuli which themselves come in different forms (terete, turbinate, clavate, peltate, falcate, vesiculate) and arrangements: distichous - ramuli are arranged evenly opposite each other (e.g. Caulerpa taxifolia), irregular - vesiculate ramuli with no distinct arrangement (e.g. Caulerpa racemosa), verticillate - whorled ramuli (e.g. Caulerpa cuppresoides).

Internal anatomy 
Caulerpa is coenocytic, meaning it has a multinucleate thallus organization. It is also siphonous, meaning unlike other algae, the thallus and the nuclei are not separated by cell walls. They are instead one long mass of protoplasm surrounded by a single cell wall. The genus also possesses trabeculae, which are inward growing cell wall extensions that pass through the central lumen of siphons. It is hypothesized that these provide the thallus with structural support, facilitate diffusion to the inner cytoplasm, and can possibly help in determining cell shape - which may contribute to the diversity of growth forms found in the genus.

Distribution 
Caulerpa is mostly found in tropical regions, however its distribution may also extend up to temperate locations. Diversity is highest in the Caribbean and the Indo-Malay region, as well as in southern Australia, where a majority of Caulerpa species are endemic.

Ecology 
The genus is typically found in shallow intertidal zones and can reach up to depths of 100 meters. They are known to be able to adapt and thrive in different environmental conditions, which contributes to their potential for becoming invasive species. Some of their traits include having a high tolerance for a wide range of temperatures, their capacity for asexual reproduction through rhizoid extension and fragmentation, their fast growth rate, as well as their capacity for nutrient intake from sediments through their rhizoids. This last trait gives them a competitive edge over other macroalgal species who mainly absorb nutrients from the water column.

Life history 
Many studies on the life cycle of Caulerpa have been found to contradict each other, leading researchers to conclude that it varies with species and geographical region. Earlier research revealed that Caulerpa has a diplontic life cycle with a diploid vegetative phase and haploid biflagellate gametes. However, it was later found that ploidy status and genome size can vary within and between species.

Exploitation and cultivation 

Some species of Caulerpa are edible. The two most commonly eaten are Caulerpa lentillifera and Caulerpa racemosa, both called "sea grapes" in English. Both are traditionally harvested in the wild and sold in local markets in Southeast Asia, Oceania, and East Asia. They are eaten raw in salads and have a characteristic "sea" flavor and a crunchy texture.

Both species are cultivated in aquaculture. Their cultivation began in the 1950s in Cebu, Philippines, after accidental introduction of C. lentillifera to fish ponds. Cultivation of C. lentillifera continued in Japan in 1986, where it was cultivated in tanks in the tropical waters of Okinawa. Commercial cultivation has since spread to other countries, including Vietnam, Taiwan, and China (in Fujian and Hainan). Most are for domestic consumption, but they are also exported to Japan.

Cultivation of Caulerpa is convenient because they can propagate through fragmentation. There are several farming techniques being used to cultivate Caulerpa, which typically involve tying fragments to different types of infrastructure. Many Pacific countries such as Japan, Philippines, Vietnam, and Samoa use the off-bottom method, where the seaweeds are grown a few meters above the ground on cages or trays. The bottom-planting method is also used in the Philippines, and involves growing the Caulerpa on a substrate. Land-based raceways in hatchery-type facilities offer a more controlled environment for cultures, and have been used more in recent years.

Chemical composition 
Caulerpa contains a high amount of iron (up to 81.3 mg per 100 g of dry matter in C. racemosa), magnesium, and calcium. Water content is species-specific and generally ranges from 75 - 94%. The genus is known to have a high bioaccumulation rate, which can make it less than ideal to consume on a regular basis. Carbohydrate content can range from 3.6 - 83.2% of dry matter depending on the species. The main pigments of Caulerpa are chlorophyll a and b. It has a high diversity of chemical compounds which have pharmaceutical potential. Although the genus is known to exhibit high toxicity, it was found to be of low risk to humans.

Utilization 
Aside from being a source of food, Caulerpa has several uses from bioremediation, to fertilizer, and health and wellness. The anti-oxidant compounds of Caulerpa have been well-studied, and these are used in treating various diseases and health conditions such as cancer and cardiovascular disorders. Caulerpa has been shown to be effective in filtering water used in culturing fish, mollusks, and shrimp (in particular C. lentillifera). The use of Caulerpa as a biofertilizer has also been studied particularly in India, where fertilizers composed of 25% Caulerpa extracts enhanced the growth and reduced the total sugar content, among other things, of Vigna mungo.

Invasive behaviour
Another species, Caulerpa taxifolia, has become an invasive species in the Mediterranean Sea, Australia and southern California (where it has since been eradicated). In U.S. waters, the Mediterranean strain of Caulerpa taxifolia is listed as a federal noxious weed, under the Plant Protection Act. The Aquatic Nuisance Species Taskforce has also created a National Management Plan for the Genus Caulerpa. The state of California also prohibits possession of nine different species of Caulerpa.

It is thought that Caulerpa species have such invasive properties in these regions due to their capability to thrive in temperate waters, along with their freedom from natural predators. Most Caulerpa species evolved in tropical waters, where herbivores have immunity to toxic compounds (mainly caulerpicin) within the alga. Temperate water herbivores have no natural immunity to these toxins, allowing Caulerpa to grow unchecked if introduced to temperate waters.

C. racemosa has recently been found in waters around Crete, where it is thought to have contributed to a significant reduction in fisheries. The alga has invaded the area from the warmer waters of the Red Sea.

C. cylindracea, which is native to Australia, has also become an invasive species in the Mediterranean.

Exotic seaweeds Caulerpa brachypus and Caulerpa parvifolia have been found in New Zealand waters at Great Barrier Island (Aotea) and Great Mercury Island (Ahuahu).

Use in aquariums
Caulerpa is common in the aquarium hobby as a nitrate absorber because of its rapid growth under relatively adverse conditions. It may also be used in refugiums for a long-term nitrite absorber. Many introductions of invasive Caulerpa to the wild are thought to have occurred via aquarium dumping although there is no proof that this is so. For this reason, some aquarium hobbyists have begun using Chaetomorpha or an algae scrubber instead.

Species 

The species currently recognized are:

Caulerpa agardhii
Caulerpa alternans
Caulerpa annulata
Caulerpa antoensis
Caulerpa articulata
Caulerpa ashmeadii
Caulerpa bartoniae
Caulerpa bikinensis
Caulerpa biserrulata
Caulerpa brachypus
Caulerpa brownii
Caulerpa buginensis
Caulerpa cactoides
Caulerpa carruthersii
Caulerpa chemnitzia
Caulerpa cliftonii
Caulerpa constricta
Caulerpa corynephora
Caulerpa crassifolia
Caulerpa cupressoides
Caulerpa cylindracea
Caulerpa delicatula
Caulerpa dichotoma
Caulerpa diligulata
Caulerpa distichophylla
Caulerpa ellistoniae
Caulerpa elongata
Caulerpa falcifolia
Caulerpa faridii
Caulerpa fastigiata
Caulerpa fergusonii
Caulerpa filicoides
Caulerpa filiformis
Caulerpa flexilis
Caulerpa floridana
Caulerpa harveyi
Caulerpa hedleyi
Caulerpa heterophylla
Caulerpa holmesiana
Caulerpa imbricata
Caulerpa juniperoides
Caulerpa kempfii
Caulerpa lagara
Caulerpa lamourouxii
Caulerpa lanuginosa
Caulerpa lentillifera
Caulerpa lessonii
Caulerpa longifolia
Caulerpa macrodisca
Caulerpa macrophysa
Caulerpa manorensis
Caulerpa matsueana
Caulerpa mexicana
Caulerpa microphysa
Caulerpa murrayi
Caulerpa nummularia
Caulerpa obscura
Caulerpa okamurae
Caulerpa oligophylla
Caulerpa ollivieri
Caulerpa opposita
Caulerpa papillosa
Caulerpa parvifolia
Caulerpa parvula
Caulerpa paspaloides
Caulerpa peltata
Caulerpa pickeringii
Caulerpa pinnata
Caulerpa plumulifera
Caulerpa prolifera
Caulerpa pusilla
Caulerpa qureshii
Caulerpa racemosa
Caulerpa remotifolia
Caulerpa reniformis
Caulerpa reyesii
Caulerpa scalpelliformis
Caulerpa sedoides
Caulerpa selago
Caulerpa serrulata
Caulerpa sertularioides
Caulerpa seuratii
Caulerpa simpliciuscula
Caulerpa spathulata
Caulerpa subserrata
Caulerpa taxifolia
Caulerpa trifaria
Caulerpa urvilleana
Caulerpa vanbossea
Caulerpa veravalensis
Caulerpa verticillata
Caulerpa vesiculifera
Caulerpa webbiana
Caulerpa zeyheri

References

Further reading

See also 
 Valonia ventricosa, another large coenocytic organism

External links

Food and Agriculture Organization - Seaweeds used as human food
ITIS report
Largest Single Cell
CISR: Caulerpa taxifolia or Killer Alga Center for Invasive Species Research page on Caulerpa taxifolia and Killer Alga
 Caulerpa.com Blog

 
Ulvophyceae genera
Edible seaweeds